Mahesh High School is a High school situated at Mahesh, Serampore in Hooghly district. It was established in 1923 by Bagala Prasad Bhattacharya, an Indian freedom fighter.

Athletics
It is renowned for its sports programs. Mahesh High has turned out many good players of soccer and volleyball. Kingshuk Debnath, the Mohun Bagan Athletic Club defender, played for Mohanbagan.

See also
Education in India
List of schools in India
Education in West Bengal

References

External links 

High schools and secondary schools in West Bengal
Schools in Hooghly district
Serampore
Educational institutions established in 1923
1923 establishments in India